The ICP Vimana is a single engine, two seat, high wing, light aircraft with STOL capability. Designed and built in Italy by ICP srl, it was introduced in 2006.

Design and development

The Vimana (Vimana is a Sanskrit word, the meanings of which include flying machine) is a conventionally arranged single engine high wing light aircraft, designed to have STOL performance. It seats two side-by-side. The Vimana is mostly constructed from riveted aluminium sheet.

The Vinama's wing is tapered, mostly on the trailing edge, and carries 2° of dihedral. On each side a single, forward leaning strut links the wing to the lower fuselage, assisted by a short intermediate strut at its wing connection. More than half the trailing edge carries inboard double slotted Fowler flaps with a maximum deflection of 40°; the rest of the trailing edge is fitted with conventional ailerons. The leading edge is fitted with electrically operated slats.

The Vimana is normally powered by a  Rotax 912 ULS flat four driving a three-bladed propeller, though the Turbo version of this engine is an option. It has a standard tricycle undercarriage with faired wheels, fitted with brakes and mounted on spring cantilever legs to the fuselage at the base of the wing spar. The faired nosewheel is steerable. A lightweight version of the Vimana has smaller wheels, as well as lighter instrumentation and cabin furnishings; overall,  is cut from the empty weight. Access to the cabin is via fully transparent, upward opening doors.  There is a small flight accessible compartment for about 20 kg of luggage behind the seats.  The underside of the fuselage tapers upwards to the tail, where all surfaces are straight-tapered. The fin and large rudder are swept, with a small fillet. The tailplane is low mounted and the separate elevators, also large, are horn balanced.

Take-off and landing runs (ground roll) are  respectively.

The design is an accepted Federal Aviation Administration special light-sport aircraft, as the Skykits Rampage.

Operational history
The Vimana first appeared in public at the Cielo e Volo show at Ozzano in June 2006. A second machine was produced in 2007 and became the North American demonstrator, flown by Skykits of Alberta, Canada, who market the Vimana as the Rampage.

As of mid-2010, there were 5 Vimanas on European registers in addition to the prototype.

Specifications (Standard weight)

References

External links
Google search for images of the ICP Vimana
 

2000s Italian sport aircraft
High-wing aircraft
Aircraft first flown in 2006